Yara Lukenia F. da Costa Lima, simply known as Yara, is an Angolan footballer who plays as a forward for GD Sagrada Esperança and the  Angola women's national team.

Club career
Yara has played for Sagrada Esperança in Angola.

International career
Yara capped for Angola at senior level during the 2021 COSAFA Women's Championship.

References

1990s births
Living people
Angolan women's footballers
Women's association football forwards
G.D. Sagrada Esperança players
Angola women's international footballers